Sandra Thompson may refer to:

 Sandra Thompson (politician) (born 1946), Louisiana state administrator
 Sandra Thompson (linguist), American linguist
 Sandra Thompson (writer), American novelist and short story writer